One Sign is a song recorded by French house group Galleon. It was released in June 2002 as the third single off their self-titled debut album. A music video was shot to promote the single.

Formats and track listings
These are the formats and track listings of promotional single releases of "One Sign".

CD single
"One Sign" Radio Edit - 3:38
"One Sign" M.A.N.D.Y. Club Mix - 6:03
"One Sign" M.A.N.D.Y. Dub Mix - 5:46
"One Sign" Extended Version - 5:32

Chart performance

References

External links
"One Sign" on Discogs

2002 singles
2002 songs